Alexander Barclay (1784 – 30 October 1864) was a member of the House of Assembly of Jamaica.

He visited Sierra Leone and brought back three ship-loads of African men that he had kidnapped to become slaves.

Selected publications
  A Practical view of the Present State of Slavery in the West Indies. Smith, Elder, London, 1826.

References 

Members of the House of Assembly of Jamaica
1784 births
1864 deaths
People from Aberdeen
Scottish emigrants to Jamaica
Planters of Jamaica
Proslavery activists